The Italian Union of Textile and Clothing Workers (UILTA) was a trade union representing workers in the textile and clothing industries in Italy.

The union was founded in 1969, when the Italian Union of Textile Workers merged with the Italian Union of Clothing Workers.  Like both its predecessors, it affiliated to the Italian Union of Labour.

By 1997, the union had 42,786 members.  In 2013, it merged with the Italian Union of Chemical, Energy and Manufacturing Workers, to form the Italian Union of Textile, Energy and Chemical Workers.

External links

References

Textile and clothing trade unions
Trade unions in Italy
Trade unions established in 1969
Trade unions disestablished in 2013
Union